Gen. Edward F. Jones House is a historic home located at Binghamton in Broome County, New York. It was constructed in 1872 and is a large -story, irregularly shaped building built of an eclectic combination of materials and textures.  It was part of a large estate assembled by General Edward F. Jones (1828–1913) by 1883.  The foundation and first floor are constructed of brick while the upper stories are of wood with shingle, beaded board, and clapboard siding.  It is an exceptional example of the Queen Anne style.

It was listed on the National Register of Historic Places in 2005.

References

Houses in Binghamton, New York
Houses on the National Register of Historic Places in New York (state)
Queen Anne architecture in New York (state)
Houses completed in 1872
National Register of Historic Places in Broome County, New York